Mazurek is a variety of cake baked in Poland for Easter. It has a flat shape and is very sweet.

According to Polish gastronomy coursebooks, typical mazurek is a cake that can be made of one or two sheets of short (or half-short) pastry or one sheet of short (or half-short) pastry covered with a sheet of butter sponge cake. The two sheets are fixed together with a help of a layer of marmalade. In case of one-sheet version, marmalade is skipped or goes on top, under the layer of icing. The top of mazurek is covered with a layer of icing (i.e. sugar icing or fudge caramel cream) or jelly. It is also decorated with nut-based icing or almond-based icing and candied fruits. Traditionally, home-baked mazurek cakes are often decorated with dried fruits and nuts.

In the one-sheet version, the cake includes the borders made of rolled half-short pastry. Sometimes the shortcrust base is crowned with a lattice made of half-short or macaroon pastry.

Among other versions, often to be found in popular cook books and gastronomy coursebooks is "Gypsy mazurek" (mazurek cygański). A sheet of half-short pastry is half-baked, covered with a layer made of dried fruit, almonds, egg yolks creamed with sugar and whipped egg white and baked again.

Mazurek tradition

Name and origin 

The cake's name may have its origins in the Masovians (old Mazurzy) tribe inhabiting the Mazovia region of central Poland. Another theory says it might originate from the word mazurek (Polish for mazurka), traditional folk dance in triple metre from Poland. A shortcrust pastry, Mazurek is considered one of the primary desserts of Easter across Poland. What distinguishes it from other festive dessert cakes is the abundance of decoration with dried fruit and nuts, its overall sweetness, and chocolate icing, contributing to its prolonged freshness.

Although considered uniquely Polish, almost a seasonal national dessert, the recipe for Mazurek came to Poland most likely from the East, via the spice trade-route from Turkey in the early 17th century.

Appearance and symbolism 

Its symbolism is closely associated with the period of Wielki Post (Polish for Lent) thus marking its successful completion. In fact, after a 40-day fast (not a total abstinence from food by any means), which is celebrated in Christian liturgy in memory of the Temptation of Christ, mazurek was supposed to be the rich reward for adherence to faith and tradition. Although today, the religious meaning of mazurek is virtually lost in Poland, the cake is closely associated with the seasonal celebrations nevertheless.

Usually, the decorative patterns includes Easter symbols like hares, pussy willows and Easter greetings.

News portal Wirtualna Polska insisted that mazurek cannot resemble any other regular cake. It is supposed to be flat in multitude of varieties, each with different flavour and lavishly decorated. Twelve of them (served side by side, as claimed by the magazine), would not be entirely out of line traditionally.

At Christmas, the emphasis on a symbolic number twelve is closely related to the Twelve Apostles at the Last Supper, celebrated by Catholics by twelve different food offerings.

Mazurek on the List of (Polish) traditional products 
The nutty mazurek ("nutty Easter shortcake", pol. mazurek orzechowy) was entered onto the list of Polish traditional bakery and confectionery products for the Kuyavian-Pomeranian Voivodeship by the Ministry of Agriculture and Rural Development (MRiRW) on 3 November 2011, described in a particular way. The shortcrust (half-short) base is prepared from ground walnuts, flour, sugar, margarine, small number of eggs and a little bit of sour cream. The frosting is a walnut cream or, according to Polish Food magazine published by MRiRW, icing made of sugar, water and milk powder melted together. The thick layer of icing is spread over baked cake and finally decorated with dried fruit (raisins), almonds and walnuts into a pattern.

See also 

 Simnel cake
 List of desserts
 List of Polish desserts
 List of cakes

Notes

References

External links
 Cookbook: Mazurek Cake recipe at Wikibooks
 The Polish edition of Newsweek magazine offered a gallery of ideas about how to decorate mazurek with slivered almonds and sliced dates including chocolate-written greetings. 

Polish desserts
Easter cakes
Christmas food
Marmalade
Walnut dishes
Polish pastries
Easter traditions in Poland